Viola Clare Bayley  (8 January 1911 –  January 1997) was a British children's writer of adventure stories.

Life 
Viola Clare Wingfield Powles was born on 8 January 1911, in Rye, Sussex.  Her parents were Isabel Grace Wingfield and Lewis Charles Powles. She was educated at Effingham House,  Behnke Drama School, and Licenciate of the Guildhall School of Music.

In the winter of 1933 she visited her uncle, a high Court Judge, in Lahore in India. There she met Vernon Thomas Bayley (C.M.G., O.B.E.) of the Indian Police and got engaged. She returned to England to be married and subsequently returned to Hangu in India with her husband in 1934. In 1935 they moved to Delhi. Over the years frequent trips to places such as Simla and Gulmarg took place. After the war, they returned to England in 1946.

The couple has two sons, two daughters.

1975/76: short memoir of the first year in India, and One Woman's Raj about her time in India .

Death: January 1997

Works

The Wings of the Morning. Tales (1936)*
The Ways of Wonderland (1938)
The Dark Lantern (1951)
White Holiday (1953)*. On holiday in Switzerland, Rosamund and her brother help their skiing instructor to uncover a mystery which threatens his life
Storm on the Marsh (1953)
April Gold (1954)
Paris Adventure (1954)
Little Mallows (1955)
Lebanon Adventure (1955)
Kashmir Adventure (1956)
Turkish Adventure (1957)
Corsican Adventure (1957)
Shadow on the Wall (1958)
Swedish Adventure (1959)
Mission on the Moor (1960)*
London Adventure (1962)
Italian Adventure (1964)
Scottish Adventure (1965)
Welsh Adventure (1966)
Austrian Adventure (1968)*
Jersey Adventure (1969)
Adriatic Adventure (1970)*
Caribbean Adventure (1971)*. Tricia and her friends the Hamilton's go to stay with their cousin Derek who has inherited an estate on the island of Grenada.
Greek Adventure (1972)
Shadows on the Cape (1985)*

* date of first edition. Other dates of first edition not verified

Shorter stories in collections:

"Turn of the Tide" in Collins Girl's Annual 1955
"Walls of Snow" in Collins Girl's Annual  (1953 ?) 128 pages
...  in Stirring Stories for Girls, 1960, Duthie, Eric. Editor
... in The Favourite Book for Girls
... in Girls' Story Omnibus
"Walls of Snow" in The Splendid Book for Girls (about 1956)

A number of these works were illustrated by Marcia Lane Foster

Other languages 

A number of her works were translated into other languages

German

Die schwarze Laterne
Abenteuer in Wales
Abenteuer in Griechenland
Abenteuer auf Jersey
Karibisches Abenteuer
Abenteuer im Libanon
Abenteuer in Paris
Schatten über Penderwick
Abenteuer in Italien
Abenteuer in Kaschmir
Abenteuer in Schottland
So tüchtig wie Tissie: Ein Sommer voller Überraschungen (1960), 127pp

French
Aventure Aux Caraïbes
Une ombre sur le mur
 Au-dessus du gouffre   in 15 histoires d'aventure pour Filles

Dutch
Het Raadsel Van Het Heidehuis
De schaduw op de muur

Swedish
Äventyr i Paris

References

Author's and Writer's Who's Who, 1963  

Viola Bayley by Julie Makin 

Viola Bayley, Rye Castle Museum

Sources
 
 
 
 
 
   Introduction by Sir Christopher Bayly

British children's writers
People from Rye, East Sussex
1911 births
1997 deaths
British people in colonial India